The dark-backed wood quail (Odontophorus melanonotus) is a bird species in the family Odontophoridae, the New World quail. It is found in Colombia and Ecuador.

Taxonomy and systematics
The dark-backed wood quail is one of 15 species in the genus Odontophorus. Within the genus, it is part of the chestnut wood quail species complex. At various times it has been proposed or considered as conspecific with chestnut wood quail (O. hyperythrus), rufous-fronted wood quail (O. erythrops), and rufous-breasted wood quail (O. speciosus).

The generic name Odontophorus is from the Greek odontophoros, meaning tooth-bearing. The specific epithet melanonotus is from the Greek melas, meaning black, and notus, meaning backed.

The species is monotypic.

Description

Adults of both sexes are overall brownish black with fine chestnut vermiculation. The throat and breast are reddish chestnut. The juvenile is similarly colored but duller overall.

Distribution and habitat

The dark-backed wood quail is found in the Andes from southern Colombia's Nariño Department south to Cotopaxi Province in Ecuador. Though primarily terrestrial, it roosts above ground in trees.

Behavior

Feeding

The dark-backed wood quail forages in groups of up to 10 birds seeking terrestrial invertebrates and fruit.

Breeding

Almost nothing is known about the dark-backed wood quail's breeding phenology. Observations of recently hatched chicks and dependent young in many different months indicate a long breeding season or possibly two of them.

Vocalization

The dark-backed wood quail's advertising song is a duet, "a fast rollicking 'koreewow-koreewow-koreewow...'" and calls include "soft whistles and mellow rolling notes."

Status

The IUCN has assessed the dark-backed wood quail as vulnerable. "This species has a small and fragmented range, with recent records from few sites. Available habitat, and presumably the population, is declining."

References

External links

BirdLife International Species Factsheet.

dark-backed wood quail
Birds of the Colombian Andes
Birds of the Ecuadorian Andes
dark-backed wood quail
Taxonomy articles created by Polbot